In mathematics, specifically in order theory and functional analysis, a subset  of a vector lattice is said to be solid and is called an ideal if for all  and  if  then  
An ordered vector space whose order is Archimedean is said to be Archimedean ordered. 
An ideal generated by a singleton set is called a principal ideal in

Examples 

In a locally convex vector lattice  the polar of every solid neighborhood of the origin is a solid subset of the continuous dual space ; 

Properties 

 A solid subspace of a vector lattice  is necessarily a sublattice of  
 If  is a solid subspace of a vector lattice  then the quotient  is a vector lattice (under the canonical order).

See also

References

  
  

Functional analysis
Order theory